Gjesling (or Gjæsling) is an old family at Vågå in Oppland, Norway.

In 1130 Ivar Gjesling was the earliest-known owner of the farm Sandbu (just south of Vågåmo) in Vågå. He served as  King Magnus IV's lendmann (governor) for the Opplands. Ivar Gjesling, allied himself with the Birchlegs (Birkebeinerne) — who chose Sverre as their king at Øreting in 1177. Sverre granted him the valley of Heidal as a reward.

Sigrid Undset's fictional Lady Ragnfrid, wife of Lavrans, was create a Gjesling from Sandbu.

Gjesling descendants still own the farm Sandbu in the Vågå region, Riddersandbu, which includes buildings built before 1600.

References 

Norwegian families